Family courts were originally created to be a Court of Equity convened to decide matters and make orders in relation to family law, including custody of children, and could disregard certain legal requirements as long as the petitioner/plaintiff came into court with “clean hands” and the request was reasonable, “quantum meruit”. Changes in laws and rules have made this distinction superfluous.

Family courts hear all cases that relate to familial and domestic relationships. Each US state and each country has a different system utilized to address family law cases including decisions regarding divorce cases.

In the United States 
Family courts were first established in the United States starting in the late 1910s at the behest of probation officers invested in the success of specialized domestic relations courts. Members of the National Probation Association (NPA) advanced the idea that "combining criminal nonsupport, juvenile delinquency, and divorce into a unified 'family court' would reduce jurisdictional overlap and ensure deep, rehabilitative treatment by probation officers across family-related conflicts." This idea was minimally successful and led to varied reformation of family courts throughout the 1920s and 1930s.

The original criminal nature of family courts was slowly replaced by an impliedly civil approach, starting in the 1930s with a New York law designed to treat nonsupport cases as a civil matter. The shift to civil nonsupport across the country and the addition of divorce jurisdiction led to family court dockets becoming more civil in nature. Those found in contempt in civil nonsupport cases were still incarcerated as they were in the criminal nonsupport system.

In 1933, New York established a standalone family court, "somewhat confusedly" called the Domestic Relations Court, to further remove family matters from criminal jurisdiction. However, in reality, this new family court and those that followed blended criminal and civil components, removing the constitutional protections offered by criminal procedure while still maintaining criminal-like enforcement mechanisms. In addition, New York passed the Uniform Support of Dependents Law (USDL) in order to provide a mechanism for interstate civil enforcement of family court rulings. 

Later, as probation officer involvement dwindled (partially attributable to the model Family Courts Act produced by the NPA in 1959) and more family courts retained jurisdiction over divorce, the machinery of family courts began to look even more civil. However, some aspects of family court enforcement still retain their criminal roots in heavy state involvement, including incarceration as a consequence of nonpayment of child support, wage garnishment, revocation of driver's licenses, and denial of passport applications. Some family courts still use older criminal nonsupport statutes, even though protections afforded by constitutional criminal procedures are oftentimes not present. Most cases are presided over by a single judge without a jury, except in the State of Texas, where parents have a right to trial by jury.  These muddy distinctions between criminal and civil proceedings within family courts have led to calls for reformation, arguing that the seemingly civil nature of family courts is a method used to circumvent criminal procedural protections while still maintaining criminal enforcement machinery.

In England and Wales 
Cases involving children are primarily dealt with under the Children Act 1989, amongst other statutes. As of April 22, 2014, there are two family courts:

The Family Division of the High Court
The Family Court

The Family Court was created by Part 2 of the Crime and Courts Act 2013, merging the family law functions of the county courts and magistrates' courts into one.

Two scenarios are covered by the Children Act of 1989: private law cases, where the applicant and respondent are usually the child's parents; and public law cases, where the applicant is the local authority and the parents are usually the respondents. There is much debate at present over whether the manner in which the law is administered generally leads to outcomes that are beneficial to the families concerned. In this context, see fathers' rights.

Cases involving domestic violence are primarily dealt with under Part IV of the Family Law Act 1996.

In England, a family court may be called upon to order child maintenance payments, when the child is either under the age of 16, or under the age of 20 receiving a full-time education (but not higher than A-Level or equivalent).

Abusive partners were sometimes allowed to cross examine their victims in ways that could be extremely stressful. Peter Kyle described this process as “abuse and brutalization” of women by the legal system: “Mothers need the protection of the law and they need to know in advance that the system is there to look out and protect their interests. It only takes one woman to be placed in a situation where she can be legally be asked by the man who has violently abused her; ‘When did you last have sex?’ That only has to happen once to realize that the system is corrupted and domestic abuse is going on in our system in the courtroom.” Changes to this process are forthcoming.

In Hong Kong 

The Family Court of Hong Kong mainly deals with divorces and welfare maintenance for children.

See also
Alimony
 Family law
 Family Procedure Rules
 Subject-matter jurisdiction
 Family Court of Australia

References 

Courts by type
Family law